The Gonzen (1,830 m) is a mountain of the Appenzell Alps, overlooking the Rhine Valley at Sargans, in the canton of St. Gallen. It lies at the southeastern end of the Alvier group.

The summit of the Gonzen can be reached via a trail on the northern side.

References

External links

Gonzen on Hikr

Mountains of the Alps
Mountains of Switzerland
Mountains of the canton of St. Gallen
Appenzell Alps